Adame is both a surname and a given name. It may refer to:

Surname:
 Alfredo Adame (born 1958), Mexican actor
 Joe Adame (born 1945), American politician
 Marco Antonio Adame (born 1960), Mexican politician

Given name:
 Adame Ba Konaré (born 1947), Malian historian and writer

References 

Feminine given names
Masculine given names